The Catholic Church in Oman is part of the worldwide Catholic Church, under the spiritual leadership of the Pope in Rome.

There are approximately 55,000 Catholics in Oman (about 2% of the total population), mostly migrant workers expatriates. Until 2023, Oman formed part of the Vicariate Apostolic of Southern Arabia along with Yemen and the United Arab Emirates, with its center in the city of Abu Dhabi. In February 2023, the Holy See and the Sultanate of Oman issued a joint statement announcing the establishment of full diplomatic relations between the two at the level of an Apostolic Nunciature to the Sultanate of Oman and an Embassy to the Holy See.

There are four parishes in Oman with 12 priests.

 Church of St. Anthony of Padua in Sohar; 
 Church of the Holy Apostles Peter and Paul in Ruwi, Muscat; 
 Church of the Holy Spirit in Ghala, Muscat; 
 Church of St. Francis Xavier in Salalah.

References

External links
 http://www.gcatholic.org/dioceses/diocese/arab0.htm
 https://web.archive.org/web/20131101045027/http://stfrancisjebelali.ae/ccsarabia.php

 
Oman
Oman
Apostolic Vicariate of Southern Arabia
Catholic Church in the Arabian Peninsula